The second generation of the BMW 4 Series consists of the BMW G22 (coupé version) along with the BMW G23 (convertible version) and BMW G26 (saloon version, marketed as the Gran Coupé) compact executive cars. The G22 4 Series was launched in June 2020 and succeeds the F32 4 Series.

The G22 will be produced alongside - and shares many features with - the G20 3 Series. As with the G20 3 Series range, the G22/G23/G26 will be powered by turbocharged petrol and diesel engines. Unlike its predecessor, the new 4 Series has a significant departure in design from the 3 Series in order to distinguish between the two models and to move the 4 Series upscale. The most notable of the design changes is the large kidney grille at the front which was inspired by the 1930s BMW 328.

Development 

The G22 4 Series was unveiled in concept form as the BMW Concept 4, at the 2019 Frankfurt Motor Show and previewing the next generation of the 4 Series. The most notable design feature is the large vertical kidney grille which is inspired by the BMW 328 and 3.0 CSi respectively. The grille has a 3D pattern design to give it a more pronounced look. Other notable design features of the concept were a pronounced duck-tail spoiler at the rear, thin wing mirrors made from a single piece of aluminium and open headlamps, which have no covering over their 3D lighting elements and are instead embedded into the body of the car.

Launch 
On 26 May 2020, BMW announced that the G22 4 Series would be unveiled online in June 2020 by posting a teaser image of the range-topping M440i model. More than 80% of the design cues from the Concept 4 were carried over to the production version including the large kidney grille which now has mesh inserts and is flanked with two slim LED headlamps and two large air intakes (exclusive for the M440i). The rear features wrap around tail lamps and a lip spoiler which is exclusive for the M Sport models. The silhouette of the car is similar to the 8 Series with a tapering roof line. The rear bumper comes with a diffuser on the M Sport models with the M440i having dual exhaust tips. The production version is claimed to have a drag area as low as 0.25 x 2.19 m2 for the Coupé. On the online unveiling, BMW announced that the worldwide launch of the G22 4 Series would be held in October of the same year.

At the end of September, BMW unveiled the convertible version of the new 4 Series (G23), with the same technology and engines as the coupe. It has a canvas roof, unlike the two predecessors which had a retractable hardtop.

Models 

The launch models consist of the diesel engine 420d, 430d and M440d, the petrol engine 420i M Sport and 430i and the mild hybrid M440i xDrive. The M440d, like the M440i, is also equipped with a mild hybrid system. The hybrid system features a belt-fed starter generator to recoup energy under braking. This power can be supplied to the car’s 12V electrical system or deployed to assist the combustion engine to help reduce  emissions and boost fuel economy.

A previously unavailable combination of the 430i with xDrive in their Gran Coupé body will be available as a MY23 version becoming the first 2023 model other than their "iX" electrified SUV.  Popular options like a Harman Kardon stereo upgrade, heads-up display and LASER headlights are all available.  Orders accepted beginning March according to BMW of NA publications.

The only available gearbox is an 8-speed automatic transmission. The M Sport models come with a modified gearbox which features faster shifts and a new "Sprint" driving mode. The 430i, 420d, 430d and M440d come standard with rear-wheel-drive but can be configured with all-wheel-drive. The M440i comes with all wheel drive only. The G22 4 series has a wider track than its predecessor and has 50/50 weight distribution.

Performance 
The 420i can accelerate from 0– in 7.5 seconds, the 430i can accelerate from 0– in 5.5 seconds (5.3 seconds for the xDrive version) while the M440i can accelerate from 0– in 4.3 seconds.

Equipment 
The 4 Series comes with various exterior packages, such as the M Sport package which adds high gloss exterior trim pieces, a carbon fibre detailing pack which replaces the high gloss trim with carbon fibre and an M Sport Pro package which adds more high gloss trim pieces and 19 inch wheels, unique interior trim and exterior colours. The 4 Series comes standard with the M Sport suspension but buyers can also have the M Adaptive suspension as an option which tweaks steering, damping, and accelerator response. Laser headlamps are also optional aside from the adaptive LED headlamps with hexagonal lighting technology. 

Most of the interior is carried over from the G20 3 Series upholstered in SensaTec faux leather with front sports seat being standard. The interior is offered in five colours with full leather upholstery being optional. The iDrive 7.0 system is standard and features an 8.8-inch screen on the centre console along with a 5.1-inch screen in the instrument cluster. A 10.3 inch screen for the infotainment system along with a 12.3 inch screen for the instrument cluster are optional. The iDrive 7.0 has over-the-air updates for the navigational maps and operating system, and features a voice-controlled digital assistant. The 4 Series comes standard with the BMW navigation, the next-generation BMW head-up display, which has a 70 percent larger projection surface, and 3D environment visualization within the digital instrument cluster. Apple Car Play and Android Auto are also standard interior amenities. A Driving Assistance Professional package is optional, which adds adaptive cruise control with stop and go, lane-keep assist with side collision avoidance, and rear automatic emergency braking.

420-430 models with the M Sport trim and M440 models can be fitted with M Performance Parts. These include a splitter, canards, a lip spoiler, larger wheels and side skirts.

Engines

Petrol

Diesel

BMW M4 (G82) 
The BMW M4 variants are the most powerful of the BMW 4 series, yielding a maximum of 503 horsepower in the M4 competition series. It was designed and developed by BMW M, a division of BMW that engineers performance variants of the company's standard vehicles. The M4 is new to the market relative to other M models, being manufactured from 2014 to the present. 

Two generations of M models have been made from the 4 series: the F32 (first generation) and the G22. Like other M variants, upgrades from the standard 4 series are designed to increase the vehicle's speed and handling. These include a more powerful engine with better response time, more powerful brake pistons and calipers, body styling adjustments, improved steering, and a better suspension.

BMW i4 (G26)

References

External links 

 

Compact executive cars
Coupés
Rear-wheel-drive vehicles
All-wheel-drive vehicles
Cars introduced in 2020
Convertibles
4 Series (G22)
G22